Mi'kma'ki or Mi'gma'gi is composed of the traditional and current territories, or country, of the Mi'kmaq people, in what is now Nova Scotia, Canada. It is shared by an inter-Nation forum among Mi'kmaq First Nations and is divided into seven geographical and traditional districts. Today Taqamkuk is separately represented as an eighth district. Mi'kma'ki is one of the confederate nations within the  Wabanaki.

History

Each district was autonomous, headed by a Sagamaw. He would meet with Wampum readers and knowledge keepers called turkey keeper's, a women's council, and the Kji Sagamaw, or Grand Chief, to form the Santeꞌ' or Mi'kmawey Mawio'mi (Grand Council). The seat of the Santeꞌ Mawioꞌmi is at Mniku in Unamaꞌkik. It  still functions as the capital today in the Potlotek reserve.

Following European contact, Mi'kma'ki was colonized by the French and British in modern Nova Scotia, who made competing claims for the land. Siding with the French, the Mi'kmaq fought alongside other Wabanaki warriors during the repeated wars between France and Britain in North America in the 17th and 18th centuries, between 1688-1763. These European powers divided Mi'kma'ki in the treaties of Utrecht (1715) and Paris (1763). After the latter, when France ceded its territories east of the Mississippi River to Britain, the British claimed Mi'kma'ki as their possession by conquest. The defeated Mi'kmaq signed the Peace and Friendship Treaties to end hostilities and encourage cooperation between the Wabanaki nations  and the British. They wanted to ensure the survival of the Mi'kmaq people, whose numbers had dwindled to a few thousand from disease and starvation. 

The power held within Mi'kma'ki faded further after the Confederation of Canada in 1867 united the colonies, establishing four provinces. The Dominion of Canada passed the Indian Act in 1876, which resulted in the loss of autonomous governance among the First Nations. The Mi'kmaq had said that they never conceded sovereignty of their traditional lands. Some analysts have advanced legal arguments that the Peace and Friendship treaties legitimized the takeover of the land by Britain.

For more than 100 years, until 2020, the Santeꞌ Mawioꞌmi (or Grand Council) was limited to functioning solely as a spiritual and dialogue forum. The Mi'kmaq and other First Nations were required to elect representatives for their governments. In 2020, however, by agreement with the Government of Canada, the Grand Council was authorized to consult on behalf of the Mi'kmaq First Nations and all First Nations in the province.

Governance

Traditionally each Mi'kmaq district had its own independent government. Those governments were composed of a chief and a council. The council included the band chiefs, elders, and other important leaders. The role of the councils was similar to those of any independent government and included the ability to make laws, establish a justice system, divide the common territory among the people for hunting and fishing, make war, and search for peace.

The overarching Grand Council Santeꞌ Mawioꞌmi was composed of the keptinaq (captains), or the district chiefs. The Grand Council also included elders, putus (historians reading the wampum belts), and a Council of women. The Grand Council was headed by a grand chief who was one of the district chiefs, generally the Unamaꞌkik chief. Succession was hereditary. The seat of the Grand Council was generally on Unamaꞌkik (Cape Breton Island).

Districts
The eight districts are the following: (names are spelled in the Franci-Smith orthography, followed by the Listuguj orthography in parens):
 Epekwitk aq Piktuk (Epegwitg aq Pigtug)
 Eskikewa'kik (Esge'gewa'gi)
 Kespek (Gespe'gewa'gi)
 Kespukwitk (Gespugwitg)
 Siknikt (Signigtewa'gi)
 Sipekni'katik (Sugapune'gati)
 Unama'kik (Unama'gi)
 Ktaqamkuk (Gtaqamg).

See also
 Mi'kmaq
 Grand Council (Mi'kmaq)
 Mi'kmaq hieroglyphic writing

References

 

Mi'kmaq
Cultural regions
Human geography
Former countries in North America